Cerconota lysalges is a moth in the family Depressariidae. It was described by Lord Walsingham in 1913. It is found in Panama.

The wingspan is about 15 mm. The forewings are pale testaceous, with a slight tawny gloss, a small brown costal spot on the summit of the arched portion of the wing followed by a larger spot of the same colour on the middle of the costa where the margin is most depressed. The hindwings are brownish testaceous.

References

Moths described in 1913
Cerconota